Escaping Polygamy is an American documentary television series that premiered on December 30, 2014, on LMN. The show now airs on Lifetime, but can also be viewed on Tubi, and follows the work of three sisters who left the Kingston clan, a polygamous group based in Salt Lake City, Utah known as The Order, as they help family and/or friends break free of polygamy. They have also helped people escape from the FLDS Church and the AUB Church. The show was originally on A&E, but later moved to Lifetime. The series was renewed for a fourth season on March 4, 2019, and premiered on Lifetime on April 1, 2019. Since the fourth season aired, Jessica Christensen, one of the three women on the show, said on Instagram that she would not be filming a fifth season of the show and that if the show were to be renewed it would have to feature different people. However, there has since been no official announcement from Lifetime regarding the future of the show.

References 

2010s American documentary television series
2014 American television series debuts
Documentaries about polygamy
Lifetime (TV network) original programming
Polygamy in the United States
Television series about polygamy